The Page Corps was a military academy in Imperial Russia, which prepared sons of the nobility and of senior officers for military service. Similarly, the Imperial School of Jurisprudence prepared boys for civil service. The present-day equivalent of the Page Corps and other Imperial military academies may be said to be the Suvorov Military Schools, though none of these was established before 1943.

History

The Page Corps was founded in 1759 in Saint Petersburg as a school for teaching and training pages and chamber pages. In light of the need for properly trained officers for the Guard units, the Page Corps was reorganized in 1802 into an educational establishment similar to cadet schools. It would accept the sons of the hereditary nobility of Russian lands, and the sons of at least Lieutenant Generals/Vice Admirals or grandsons of full Generals/Admirals. In 1802, the curriculum of the Page Corps was also changed, thereafter based on the ideals of the Order of Saint John.

In 1810, the school was moved to the palace of the Sovereign Order of Saint John of Jerusalem, also known as Vorontsov Palace. It continued at this location in Saint Petersburg for over one hundred years, until the Russian Revolution in 1917.

During the period of reforms of military schools in the 1860s, the Page Corps was turned into a seven-grade establishment, the first five grades being similar to military gymnasiums, and the other two being modelled after military colleges. Beginning in 1885, the Page Corps had seven general classes, where students learned the same sciences offered by cadet schools, and two special classes, where they were taught military science and jurisprudence. By the 1880s, separate infantry, cavalry and artillery departments were in existence.

The Corps des Pages, as it was generally referred to in pre-Revolutionary Russia, was the only military academy (out of about twenty) to prepare future officers for all arms. The others were devoted to specialized training for cavalry, infantry, artillery, engineers, cossacks, topographical studies, etc. While most graduates entered the Russian Imperial Army as officers, a minority opted for diplomatic or civil service careers.

Life in the Page Corps

In common with the other Russian military schools, the Page Corps imposed a harsh regime on its cadets. Corporal punishment involved beatings with a birch for even minor offences, and bullying of younger students by their seniors was common.

Peter Kropotkin's memoirs detail the hazing and other abuse of pages for which the Corps had become notorious. However, the education provided was of a relatively high standard, with courses in mathematics, languages, sciences, and military subjects.

Court role and privileges
The students served on a rotational basis as pages at Court and provided services at ceremonies, including attendance upon individual members of the Imperial family.

Graduates from the Page Corps had the unique privilege of joining the regiment of their own choice, regardless of the existing vacancies (however, as a matter of etiquette, the consent of the unit's commander was sought beforehand). As serving officers, they wore, on the left side of their tunic, the badge of the Page Corps, modeled after the cross of the Order of Saint John.

Upon graduation, the cadets received the rank of podporuchik (cornet in cavalry). Those who preferred employment as diplomats or government officials, rather than military service, would receive civil service ranks of the 10th, 12th, and 14th class.

Uniform

The Page Corps had a range of uniforms for different purposes. The most spectacular of these was the gala uniform worn for Court functions. This comprised a spiked helmet with white plume, a dark green tunic with gold braid covering the front, white breeches and high boots.

Disbandment
From its inception until 1917, the Page Corps graduated 4,505 officers. An additional 200 were unable to complete their courses because of the revolution of 1917. The school effectively ceased to function following the overthrow of Tsar Nicholas II in February 1917, and it was finally closed in June of the same year on the orders of Alexander Kerensky, War Minister of the Provisional Government.

References

External links
 
 Russian Imperial Corps of Pages. An Online Exhibition Catalog // Rare Book & Manuscript Library (RBML) of Columbia University

Military of the Russian Empire
Education in Russia
Military education and training in Russia
History of Saint Petersburg
Education in Saint Petersburg
1759 establishments in the Russian Empire
1917 disestablishments in Russia
1750s establishments in the Russian Empire
18th century in Saint Petersburg